The Registered Traveler Pilot Program was an airline passenger security assessment system tested in the United States air travel industry in 2005. It was used in several U.S. airports in a voluntary pilot phase and continues in operation in several airports around the country. It is administered by TTAC, the Transportation Security Administration (TSA) office responsible for Secure Flight, the replacement for the Computer Assisted Passenger Prescreening System (CAPPS) and the canceled CAPPS II counter-terrorism system. Registered Traveler is a public and private partnership between the TSA and the Registered Traveler Interoperability Consortium (RTIC) providing rules and standards for private Enrollment Providers that sign up participants.  At 11:00 p.m. PST on June 22, 2009, Clear (the largest of the three companies offering the Registered Traveler program) ceased operations because Clear and its parent company, Verified Identity Pass, Inc., filed for bankruptcy.  The company was then acquired by Alclear LLC and "Clear lanes" were opened at Denver International Airport, Orlando International Airport, Dallas/Fort Worth International Airport, and San Francisco International Airport. Clear is currently operating at 60 airports, airports, stadiums, and other venues nationwide as of January 2020.

Overview
The program seeks to identify passengers who pose a minimal security risk, and then provide those passengers an enhanced security checkpoint experience. Passengers will voluntarily pay a fee and submit to a background check to become a Registered Traveler. Passengers who pass the background check will be issued a smartcard credential for use at the security checkpoints of airports that participate in the program. Registered Travelers will have access to a reserved security lane and will enjoy a shorter wait at the security checkpoint. Other benefits, such as allowing Registered Travelers to keep their coats and shoes on and their laptops in their bags have also been discussed. Any U.S. citizen or lawful permanent resident over the age of 18 can apply for membership, as can minors over the age of 12 with parental or guardian sponsorship.

In order to prevent a terrorist with a clean background from compromising the system, the TSA requires that registered travelers undergo the normal TSA screening (baggage x-ray and personal metal detector), at the RT kiosk checkpoint.  Additionally, Registered Travelers are not exempt from random secondary screening and may not bring prohibited items into secure areas of terminals.

Airports 
These airports operated the Clear Registered Traveler program until June 2009 and currently other Registered Traveler programs:
Albany International Airport (ALB)
Cincinnati Northern Kentucky International Airport (CVG), Terminal 3
Denver International Airport (DEN)
Gulfport-Biloxi International Airport (GPT)
Hartsfield-Jackson Atlanta International Airport (ATL)
Indianapolis International Airport (IND)
Jacksonville International Airport (JAX)
LaGuardia International Airport (LGA), Delta/Northwest Terminal and B gates in the Central Terminal
Little Rock National Airport (LIT)
Logan International Airport (BOS)
John F. Kennedy Airport (JFK), Terminals 1, 4, and 7
Newark Liberty International Airport, Terminal B (EWR)
Norman Y. Mineta San Jose International Airport (SJC), Terminal A and C
Oakland International Airport (OAK)
Orlando International Airport (MCO)
Reno/Tahoe International Airport (RNO)
Ronald Reagan Washington National Airport (DCA)
San Francisco International Airport (SFO), Terminals 1 and 3
Salt Lake City International Airport (SLC)
Washington Dulles International Airport (IAD)
Westchester County Airport (HPN)

These airports are currently implementing RT programs:
Toronto Pearson International Airport (YYZ)

These airports intend to implement RT programs in the near future:

The following airports have expressed interest and/or have requested TSA approval for the RT program:
Baltimore-Washington International Thurgood Marshall Airport (BWI)
Birmingham International Airport (BHM)
Chicago Midway International Airport (MDW)
Huntsville International Airport (HSV)
Los Angeles International Airport (LAX)
O'Hare International Airport (ORD)
Pittsburgh International Airport (PIT)
Springfield-Branson National Airport (SGF)
Ted Stevens Anchorage International Airport (ANC)

Programs 
The Registered Traveler programs are interoperable; someone who is registered with one RT program can participate in programs operated by other providers.

Clear

Clear, operated by Verified Identity Pass, was the largest Registered Traveler program participant with almost 200,000 members. Clear was founded by Steven Brill, the founder of Court TV. Clear had programs at Albany, Cincinnati, Denver, Dulles Washington D.C., Indianapolis, Little Rock, New York LaGuardia, New York JFK, Newark, Oakland, Orlando, Reagan Washington D.C., Salt Lake City, San Jose, San Francisco and Westchester Airports.

On July 26, 2008, a laptop containing the names, addresses, birth dates, driver's license numbers, and passport information of 33,000 Clear customers was reported stolen from a secured room in San Francisco International Airport. The information was on an unencrypted laptop, in contravention of TSA rules, although it was protected by two levels of password protection.

As a result of the theft, TSA officials ordered Clear to inform affected customers, suspend enrollment of new customers, and cease use of unencrypted computers as well as secure devices until encryption can be installed, as required by TSA rules. Verified Identity Pass must submit an independent audit of its systems to the TSA before the company can register new customers.

On August 4, 2008 TSA Suspends Verified Identity Pass, Inc. Clear Registered Traveler Enrollment

On August 5, 2008, the laptop was found in the same room where it went missing. Officials are currently investigating whether any personal data was accessed as well as the circumstances of the reappearance.

On June 22, 2009, Clear announced they would cease operations effective immediately, citing an inability of Verified Identity Pass, Inc to obtain necessary financing. The entire contents of Clear's Web site was removed and most pages redirected to this simple statement: 
Clear Lanes Are No Longer Available.

At 11:00 p.m. PST on June 22, 2009, Clear will cease operations. Clear’s parent company, Verified Identity Pass, Inc. has been unable to negotiate an agreement with its senior creditor to continue operations. 

On July 6, 2009 Two law firms filed a class-action lawsuit on behalf of customers of Clear’s parent company, Verified Identity Pass, Inc that suddenly shut down on June 22.

The lawsuit was filed in the U.S. District Court for the Southern District of New York against Verified Identity Pass Inc., by Schneider Wallace Cottrell Brayton Konecky LLP and Kaplan Fox. The suit claims that by ceasing operations and not offering refunds, VIP committed conversion, fraud, breach of contract, negligence and unjust enrichment.  Additional lawsuits since have focused upon demanding the return or destruction of personal information, social security numbers, credit card numbers, fingerprints and iris scans in addition to refunding membership fees.

On April 16, 2010, Judge Stuart M. Bernstein of the U.S Bankruptcy Court in Manhattan granted approval to Alclear LLC to purchase the CLEAR assets after outbidding rival Henry Inc.

On May 3, 2010, Verified Identity Pass was purchased by Alclear LLC. Alclear LLC has brought Clear back and honored the time left on all Clear's original customers whose membership may have been terminated before the end of their contracts. In November 2010, Clear re-opened in Denver and Orlando airports.

, Clear is operational in nineteen cities.

iQueue
FLO Corporation has partnered with Cogent and iQueue to deliver RT solutions and services. They expected to bring back the Registered Traveler program in the "Fall of 2010" starting with Indianapolis International Airport, with further expansions planned after.  The website still exists (flyiqueue.com) but the registered traveler enrollment is not as yet operational.

FLO
The FLO Corporation, in conjunction with FLO Alliance partners, provides biometric identification technologies and credentialing processes for use in airports in accordance with the Registered Traveler program.  Final enrollment centers are located in the Washington, D.C. area, or by on-location appointment for corporate accounts.

RtGo
RtGo was operated by Unisys Corporation (It had been bought out by FLO and was being operated by IRAM Associates). Membership was $100 per year, with option to prepay for up to 5 years. Shortly after the buyout, the company went out of business and was shut down in July 2009. The office at the Reno/Tahoe International Airport is no longer in use and both enrollment and special RTGo lines are no longer in use. The verification kiosks have also been removed. Instead, business travelers are encouraged to utilize the business (black diamond) lane at the checkpoint.

Preferred Traveler
The Preferred Traveler program is run by Vigilant Solutions, a Jacksonville Beach-based company. The company’s program differentiates itself by adding a suite of value-added services for the traveler.

Identifying information

Passengers who participate in this system must first provide personal biographical information including name, address, phone number, citizenship status, and previous addresses, along with other information. The biographical information will be collected by a commercial Registered Traveler service provider. The biographical portion of the enrollment may be accomplished via a secure web site. Next, the applicant will proceed to the biometric phase of the enrollment process. During biometric enrollment applicants will present identification documents and fingerprints. Applicants may also choose to have an image of their iris taken if they wish to use an iris image as an alternative to a fingerprint scan at the security checkpoint. The iris image is totally non-invasive to the eye.  Once the biometric enrollment is complete, the service provider submits the collected data to the TSA which performs a Security Threat Assessment (STA) of the applicant. If the assessment does not indicate that the applicant is suspected of posing a risk to aviation security, the TSA will return an approved STA result to the service provider. The service provider will then provide the passenger with a Registered Traveler card. The card will be a smartcard, containing biometric information to prevent the card from being used by unauthorized persons. This card will then be inserted into a verification kiosk at the special checkpoints, which will verify the passengers biometrics (fingerprint or iris scan) and acknowledge membership and clearance to proceed to RT screening.

Controversy

Privacy

This system, like the related Secure Flight, has come under fire for its privacy implications although less so because Registered Traveler unlike Secure Flight is voluntary. The potential effectiveness has also been questioned. On the privacy front Registered Traveler collects far more information than Secure Flight including biometrics. While supporters assert that this program is voluntary, critics assert that RT's extensive background checks will be misused. The privacy safeguards and rules can be found in the RTIC specification and the TSA RT Privacy Impact Assessment (PIA). Many airports and airlines already offer access to shorter "priority" security lines to first class or other status travelers without requiring any background checks.

Effectiveness

Similar to the concerns raised about CAPPS and CAPPS II, critics point out that any program designed to exclude certain passengers from scrutiny will provide a backdoor for potential terrorists, since they would likely seek Registered Traveler status. This criticism draws on the 9/11 Commission finding that 9 of the 19 hijackers involved in the September 11, 2001 attacks were flagged by the CAPPS I system but were not intercepted, because security was focused on luggage bombs. However, those participating in the Registered Traveler Program currently pass through the same security checkpoints and are screened the same as any other individual, the main difference being RT members enjoy a much shorter wait before screening.   Currently RT programs do not offer a reduced security check, but their announced plans indicate they intend to offer this if airport officials allow it.

Fairness

Because the Registered Travelers Program, in its current form, does not exempt members from any of the security checks of the TSA, it is often criticized as merely being a method by which frequent travelers can pay an annual fee to a private company in order to be permitted to move to the head of the TSA line and not wait their turn along with less frequent travelers.  Since the TSA lines are a government program (funded by equal payments on tickets of frequent travelers and non-travelers), this strikes many as being unfair to less frequent travelers.

See also

No Fly List
CATSA

References

External links

Organizations 
Registered Traveler Interoperability Consortium
Clear Registered Traveler Program
FLO Corporation
Preferred Traveler Program(spam Advert)
RtGo Program(Broken Link - Spam Advert)

Documents 
Technical Interoperability Specification for Registered Traveler
v1.2 (Spam Advert)
v1.5 (Spam Advert)
v1.7 (Spam Advert)
DHS Registered Traveler Privacy Impact Assessment

Aviation security
Expedited border crossing schemes